Har Dil Jo Pyar Karega is an 2000 Hindi-language romantic comedy film directed by Raj Kanwar, produced by Sajid Nadiadwala, written by Rumi Jaffrey, and edited by Sanjay Verma. Salman Khan, Preity Zinta and Rani Mukerji are featured in lead roles. The film is the Hindi remake of the Malayalam film Chandralekha (1997) starring Mohanlal. The film marked the first of four collaborations between Zinta and Mukerji, who went on to co-star in Chori Chori Chupke Chupke (2001) (also starring Khan in the lead), Veer-Zaara (2004) and Kabhi Alvida Naa Kehna (2006).

Har Dil Jo Pyar Karega was the third consecutive hit between Khan and Nadiadwala's collaboration after Jeet (1996) and Judwaa (1997) as well as one of the year's top-earnings films with a gross of  worldwide. The film entered the top 10 chart in the UK.

At the 46th Filmfare Awards, Har Dil Jo Pyar Karega received 2 nominations – Best Supporting Actress (Mukerji) and Best Female Playback Singer (Preeti & Pinky for "Piya Piya").

Plot 

Raj (Salman Khan) is a singer trying to make his way in the big city of Mumbai. He rescues a young woman who has fallen in front of a train and stays with her when she is rushed to a hospital. Pooja Oberoi (Rani Mukerji), the daughter of a wealthy family, survives but falls into a coma. Her family rushes to the hospital and, finding Raj there, assumes that he is Pooja's husband, Romi, with whom she had eloped to marry and whom they had never met. Since Pooja's father has a higher chance of a heart attack, Raj lies and says he is Romi.

As the family gets to know the pretend Romi, Pooja's best friend, Jahnvi (Preity Zinta) starts spending a lot of time with him. They both fall in love with each other, who is regarded as a second daughter by Pooja's family. Then Pooja revives from her coma and complicates matters by falling for Raj. In a conversation, Pooja and Jahnvi both reveal that they both love Raj using signs (Hand up) but Jahnvi realises that Pooja loves Raj resulting in her putting her hand down. Raj and Jahnvi put their relationship to an end. On the day of their engagement, Jahnvi unknowingly takes Pooja's cell phone (Her and Pooja's cellphone look the same). Knowing that Raj will never marry Pooja if she's there, she decides to leave. When Jahnvi's cell phone rings, Pooja picks it up and it ends up being Raj's best friend who pleads Jahnvi to break this wedding and come back to Raj. Pooja then reveals to everyone about Raj and Jahnvi and Raj and Jahnvi are once reunited. Pooja chooses Rahul (Shah Rukh Khan) to marry her.

Cast
 Salman Khan as Raj (Raju)/Romi
 Preity Zinta as Jahnvi 
 Rani Mukerji as Pooja Oberoi
 Rajeev Verma as Bharat Oberoi, Pooja's father
 Paresh Rawal as Goverdhan, Jahnvi's father 
 Neeraj Vora as Abdul
 Shakti Kapoor as Abdul's uncle
 Satish Shah as Mahesh Hirwani
 Kamini Kaushal as Biji
 Vinay Pathak as Monty
 Razak Khan as Dance master
Anu Malik as himself (special appearance)
Sameer as himself (special appearance)
 Sana Saeed as Anjali Khanna (special appearance)
 Shah Rukh Khan as Rahul Khanna (Guest appearance)

Music

The music of the film was composed by Anu Malik. According to the Indian trade website Box Office India, with around 22,00,000 units sold, this film's soundtrack album was one of the highest-selling soundtracks of the year. "Har Dil Jo Pyar Karega", "Piya Piya", "Ek Garam Chai Ki Pyali Ho" and "Aisa Pehli Baar Hua Hai Satrah Athrah Saalon Mein" garnered special popularity, and the soundtrack album was positively received. Screen rated the soundtrack album number one for the third week of August 2000. As of 2020, fans are petitioning for all the songs to be on TikTok.

Interestingly, the movie featured a special appearance by Anu Malik and Sameer who were to compose Raj's album in the movie.

Critical reception
The film was generally well received by the critics, with the performances of the three leads receiving particular praise. 

Film journal Screen praised the performances of Khan and Zinta and wrote, "The director deserves to be commended for his efforts to spring a few surprises in the film and extract better performances from the lead players." Aparajita Saha of Rediff wrote that the film is "guaranteed to give audiences everywhere that mushy, gooey, everything-is-all-right-with-the-world sensation they crave." Vinayak Chakravorty of Hindustan Times praised Zinta and noted Kanwar for his "treatment is frothy in the romantic first half and sensibly balanced in the mushy second."

Dinesh Raheja of India Today wrote, "a fluorescent feel-good film, with everything from the psychedelic sets to the multitude of outfits being as colourful as a candy wrapper." Madhur Mittal of The Tribune was particularly fond of the "devastating, delightful, delicious duo" of Zinta and Mukherji", noting their comic timing.

Awards 
Aashirwad Awards:
 Best Actress – Rani Mukerji
46th Filmfare Awards:
Nominated

 Best Supporting Actress – Rani Mukerji
 Best Female Playback Singer – Preeti & Pinky for "Piya Piya"

References

External links
 

2000 films
2000s Hindi-language films
Indian romantic musical films
Films scored by Anu Malik
Films scored by Surinder Sodhi
Hindi remakes of Malayalam films
Films directed by Raj Kanwar